The Royal Moroccan Athletics Federation (Fédération Royale Marocaine d’Athlétisme, FRMA) is Morocco's  governing body for the sport of athletics. It was established in 1957 and has been affiliated to the International Association of Athletics Federations (IAAF) since 1958. It is also a member of the Confederation of African Athletics since 1973.

Since December 2006, the president of the federation is Abdeslam Ahizoune beating former athlete and world champion Hicham El Guerrouj in the elections.

Morocco's kit are currently supplied by Asics.

References

External links
 FRMA official website

Morocco
Athletics in Morocco
Sports organizations established in 1957
1957 establishments in Morocco
National governing bodies for athletics
Sports governing bodies in Morocco